The Ghost of Orion is the thirteenth studio album by British doom metal band My Dying Bride. It was released on 6 March 2020 through Nuclear Blast.

Background
The album is the band's first with new member Jeff Singer, replacing Shaun Taylor-Steels who departed due to "unresolvable drumming issues". Aaron Stainthorpe's five-year-old daughter was diagnosed with cancer a couple years after the release of the band's previous album Feel the Misery, from which she was later declared in remission.

Mark Mynett is the producer and studio engineer for the album and Jo Quail performs cello on some songs.

The album's first single, "Your Broken Shore", was released on 20 January, followed by a second single, "Tired of Tears", on 7 February.

Reception

The Ghost of Orion received generally positive reviews. At Metacritic, which assigns a weighted average rating out of 100 to reviews from mainstream publications, the album received an average score of 81, based on four reviews. 

Thom Jurek of AllMusic wrote a positive review, remarking that "The Ghost of Orion was born in the aftermath of strife, strain, and fear; but these are balanced by gratitude, endurance, and even benevolence; the conflicting tensions exist with no attempt to alleviate them, and all of these qualities are among the many reasons My Dying Bride has, for more than three decades, reigned at the pinnacle of doom metal." 

New Noise Magazine, in an article detailing an interview with Stainthorpe, described him as having "one of his most impressive vocal performances to date".

Track listing

Personnel
Aaron Stainthorpe – vocals
Andrew Craighan – all guitars
Lena Abé – bass guitar
Shaun Macgowan – keyboards, violins
Jeff Singer – drums, percussion

Additional personnel
Jo Quail – cello
Lindy Fay Hella – vocals on "The Solace"

Charts

Notes

References 

2020 albums
My Dying Bride albums
Nuclear Blast albums